Jyothi Yarraji (born 28 August 1999) is an Indian track and field athlete who specializes in 100 metre hurdles. She holds the Indian national record for 100 m hurdles after breaking the long-standing record by Anuradha Biswal when she ran 13.23s on 10 May 2022. She has broken the record multiple times ever since.

She represented India at the 2022 Commonwealth Games in the 100 metres hurdles and was a part of the Indian Women's 4 X 100 metres relay team that came 5th in the finals.

At the 2022 edition of India's National Games, she won the Gold in both 100 metres and 100 metres hurdles.

On 17th October 2022, she became the first Indian woman hurdler to clock below 13 seconds - this made her the second best Asian in the 100 metres women's hurdles in the year and the 11th best Asian ever.

At the 2022 Indian Open Nationals, she was adjudged the best athlete among women.

References

External links 
 

1999 births
Living people
Indian female hurdlers
Sportspeople from Visakhapatnam
Athletes from Andhra Pradesh
Sportswomen from Andhra Pradesh
Athletes (track and field) at the 2022 Commonwealth Games
Commonwealth Games competitors for India
21st-century Indian women
21st-century Indian people